The 1981 NBA All-Star Game was an exhibition basketball game which was played February 1, 1981, at the Richfield Coliseum in Richfield, Ohio. This was the 31st edition of the National Basketball Association All-Star Game and was played during the 1980–81 NBA season. Coaches: Billy Cunningham, Philadelphia 76ers (Eastern Conference) and John MacLeod, Phoenix Suns (Western Conference); MVP: Nate Archibald, Boston (25 minutes, 9 points and 9 assists).

Injury replacements: Eastern Conference — Cleveland forward Mike Mitchell for Atlanta forward Dan Roundfield (right calf); Western Conference — none.

Team rosters

Western Conference

Eastern Conference

Score by periods
 

Halftime— East, 61–58
Third Quarter— East, 97–88
Officials: Paul Mihalak and Darell Garretson.
Attendance: 20,239.

External links
 1981 NBA All Star Game Box Score
 1981 NBA All Star Game Recap

National Basketball Association All-Star Game
All-Star
Sports in Richfield Township, Summit County, Ohio